Lunatic Calm were an English electronic music group formed in 1996. Despite a wide-ranging sound palette, the group was best known for their high impact, industrial-tinged big beat compositions.

History

Formed in 1996 and composed of Simon "sHack" Shackleton and Howard "Howie" Saunders, they released two well received albums, as well as several singles and a wide range of remixes. The two had known each other since an early age, and prior to forming Lunatic Calm, they also played in several bands with Thom Yorke (Radiohead frontman), namely Headless Chickens and Flicker Noise.

Metropol (1997)
Their debut album Metropol was often compared to the works of The Prodigy and other bands, although it ranged from offbeat and psychedelic trip hop to heavy turbo-charged big beat. Record company MCA failed to support the band and they switched their attentions to the American market where they enjoyed a series of successful tours with other groups including Crystal Method. The most notable track from that album, and the one for which the group remains best known, is "Leave You Far Behind". This track has appeared on numerous movie soundtracks including The Matrix, Charlie's Angels, and Mortal Kombat: Annihilation, also including The Crow in 1998–1999.  A number of Lunatic Calm's tracks were used on video games, and the group did numerous remixes for various artists including Bush, DJ Scissorkicks, and Curve.

Breaking Point (2002)
The group's second album, Breaking Point was released in 2002, after several years of wrangling with record companies, and with little to no promotion. As the album was due to be released, the record label City of Angels went bankrupt. Without label support the band were unable to continue and Lunatic Calm disbanded in 2003.

Aftermath 

Simon Shackleton has been highly active as a solo producer and DJ ever since, operating primarily under the name Elite Force, but also under aliases such as Killer Elite, Futurecore, Double Black, pHrack R and Zodiac Cartel. He has run labels such as U&A Recordings (2006–present) and the Fused & Bruised imprint between 1996 and 2002, and is often cited as one of the leading proponents of the emergent Tech-Funk movement, fusing house, breaks, Electro and Techno. Some of his songs (both remixes and new tracks) have appeared on the Crystal Method remix albums, Community Service and Community Service II amongst others. He is currently recording an album as Simon Shackleton which is scheduled for release in early 2016 and has become a regular performer and attendee at the Burning Man Festival in Nevada each summer.

Howie is now one half of DoubleDose, a music production and sound design partnership he set up in 2004 with BAFTA award winner Nick Ryan, devising multimedia marketing campaigns, live event productions and sonic branding for companies such as Nokia, Shell, Ernst & Young, Ford, Mazda, Land Rover, Intel and Formula One motor racing across Europe, North America & Asia Pacific. Howie is also a Director at AudioFuel, which launched in December 2008 and offers music that is custom-composed for runners and personal fitness training programs.

Discography

Albums
 Metropol (1997)
 Breaking Point (2002)

Singles
"Centista" (1996)
"Leave You Far Behind" (1997)
"Roll the Dice" (1997)
"LC Double '0' Series" (1998)
"One Step" (1999)

Remixes
 The Heads - "Don't Take My Kindness for Weakness" (1996)
 Amen - "Vacuum" (1996)
 Collapsed Lung - "Ballad Night" (1996)
 Hurricane #1 - "Chain Reaction" (1997)
 Black Grape - "Get Higher" (1997)
 Bush - "Comedown" (1997)
 Curve - "Chinese Burn" (1997)
 Definition of Sound - "Outsider" (1997)
 Elite Force - "Cool Like The Man" (1997)
 Meat Katie - "Boned"(1997)
 Pitchshifter - "Genius" (1998)
 Mankind Liberation Front - "Isolated" (1999)
 DJ Scissorkicks - "Clap Yo' Hands" (1999)
 Earl Hagen - "I Spy" (2001)

Soundtrack appearances
 The Jackal (1997) - "Leave You Far Behind"
 Mortal Kombat: Annihilation (1997) - "Leave You Far Behind" (V2. Instrumental Mix)
 Head On (1998) - "Leave You Far Behind"
 ESPN X-Games Pro Boarder (1998) - "Leave You Far Behind"
 The Matrix (1999) - "Leave You Far Behind" (Lunatic vs. Lunatic Rollercoaster Remix)
 Twin Dragons (Theatrical Trailer) (1999) - "Leave You Far Behind"
 Arlington Road (1999) - "Neon Reprise"
 Need for Speed: High Stakes (1999) - "Roll the Dice"
 Test Drive 6  (1999) - "Leave You Far Behind"
 FIFA 2000 (1999) - "LC001" (Neon Ray Mix)
 La Femme Nikita: Getting Out of the Reverse (2000) - "Leave You Far Behind"
 Charlie's Angels (2000) - "Leave You Far Behind" (V2. Instrumental Mix)
 The Guilty (2000) - "Leave You Far Behind"
 Titan A.E. (Trailer) (2000) - "Leave You Far Behind"
 Formula One 2001 (2001) - "Shockwave"
 Jeremy McGrath Supercross World (2001) - "Leave You Far Behind"
 Tomcats (2001) - "Roll the Dice" (Fatboy Slim vocal mix)
 Spider-Man (Teaser Trailer) (2002) - "Leave You Far Behind"
 Buffy the Vampire Slayer: Radio Sunnydale (2003) - "Sound of the Revolution"
 Lara Croft Tomb Raider: The Cradle of Life: Music from and Inspired by the Motion Picture (2003) - "Leave You Far Behind"
 MotorStorm (2007) - "Leave You Far Behind"
 Drive (2007) - "Leave You Far Behind"

References

External links
 Simon Shackleton site

English electronic music groups
Musical groups established in 1996
Musical groups disestablished in 2003
Musical groups from London
MCA Records artists
Big beat groups